This is a list of the extreme points of Cyprus: the points that are farther north, south, east or west than any other location.

Longitude / Latitude

Mainland Cyprus 

 North : Cape Apostolos Andreas
 South : Cape Gata
 West : Cape Arnauti
 East : Cape Apostolos Andreas

Including offshore islands 

 North : Klidhes Islands
 South : Cape Gata
 West : Cape Arnauti
 East : Klidhes Islands

Altitude 
 Highest point : Mount Olympus, 1 951 m/6 496 ft 
 Lowest point : Limassol Salt Lake, -2.7 m/8.85 ft

See also 
 Extreme points of Europe
 Extreme points of Earth
 Geography of Cyprus

Notes

Geography of Cyprus
Cyprus
Lists of coordinates
Lists of landforms of Cyprus